Michael Müller (born 29 August 1976) is an Austrian bobsledder. He competed at the 1998 Winter Olympics and the 2002 Winter Olympics.

References

1976 births
Living people
Austrian male bobsledders
Olympic bobsledders of Austria
Bobsledders at the 1998 Winter Olympics
Bobsledders at the 2002 Winter Olympics
People from Vöcklabruck
Sportspeople from Upper Austria